To speak "sweet nothings" is a form of flirting. 

Sweet Nothings or Sweet Nothing may refer to:

Dramatic arts
 Sweet Nothing (film), a 1995 film with Michael Imperioli and Mira Sorvino
 Sweet Nothings, a 2010 adaptation by David Harrower of Liebelei (play) by Arthur Schnitzler (1894)

Music
 Sweet Nothings, an all-female group at Exeter University

Albums 
 Sweet Nothing (album), a 2003 album by Tex Perkins and the Dark Horses
 Sweet Nothing, a 1999 album by Sonic's Rendezvous Band
 Sweet Nothings (album), a 2014 album by Dog Fashion Disco
 Sweet Nothings, a 2013 EP by Plini

Songs
"Sweet Nothin's", a 1959 song by Brenda Lee
 "Sweet Nothing", a 1985 single by Working Week
 "Sweet Nothing", a 2012 song by Calvin Harris featuring Florence Welch
 "Sweet Nothing" (Gabrielle Aplin song), 2015
 "Sweet Nothing" (Taylor Swift song), 2022
 "Sweet Nothings", a 1975 song by Loudon Wainwright III from Unrequited
 "Sweet Nothings", a 2014 song by Neck Deep from  Wishful Thinking
 "Oh! Sweet Nuthin'", a 1970 song by the Velvet Underground
 "Sweet Nothing's", a 2017 song by Ai from Wa to Yo